Benedicto Godoy Véizaga (born 28 July 1924, date of death unknown) was a Bolivian football who played as a forward for Bolivia in the 1950 FIFA World Cup. Godoy is deceased.

Career
Godoy scored two goals at the 1949 South American Championship. He also played for Ferroviario La Paz.

References

External links
FIFA profile

1924 births
Year of death missing
Footballers from La Paz
Bolivian footballers
Bolivia international footballers
Association football forwards
1950 FIFA World Cup players
1949 South American Championship players